Steven King (May 14, 1958 – June 3, 2014) was an American record producer and audio engineer from Detroit, most known for his work at 54 Sound in Ferndale, Michigan with Shady/Aftermath artists. He won a Grammy Award for Best Rap Album at 45th Annual Grammy Awards for The Eminem Show.

Death 
Survived by his wife, Roberta, and his son Nick, as well a sister, Jennifer Orr, stepdaughter Kimberly Freiwald and stepson Christopher VanderBerg, he died at 56 on June 3, 2014, following a battle with liver disease.

Awards and nominations 

!
|-
|align=center|2000
|The Marshall Mathers LP
|Grammy Award for Album of the Year
|
|
|-
|align=center|2002
|"Without Me"
|Grammy Award for Record of the Year
|
|
|-
|align=center|2002
|The Eminem Show
|Grammy Award for Album of the Year
|
|
|-
|align=center|2002
|The Eminem Show
|Grammy Award for Best Rap Album
|
|
|-
|align=center|2003
|"Lose Yourself"
|Grammy Award for Record of the Year
|
|
|-

References

External links 

1958 births
2014 deaths
American audio engineers
Record producers from Michigan
American hip hop record producers
Grammy Award winners for rap music
People from Northville, Michigan